Anuraeopsis is a genus of rotifers belonging to the family Brachionidae.

The species of this genus are found in Europe and America.

Species:
 Anuraeopsis coelata de Beauchamp, 1932 
 Anuraeopsis cristata Berzinš, 1956

References

Rotifer genera
Brachionidae